Sternidocinus barbarus is a species of longhorn beetles of the subfamily Lamiinae, and the only species in the genus Sternidocinus. It was described by Van Dyke in 1920.

References

Acanthocinini
Beetles described in 1920
Monotypic beetle genera